The Type 4 rifle, often referred to as the Type 5 rifle, (Japanese: 四式自動小銃 Yon-shiki Jidōshōju) was a Japanese experimental semi-automatic rifle. It was based on the American M1 Garand with an integral 10-round magazine and chambered for the Japanese 7.7×58mm Arisaka cartridge. Where the Garand used an en-bloc clip, the Type 4's integral magazine was charged with two 5-round stripper clips and the rifle also used Japanese-style tangent sights. 

The Type 4 had been developed alongside several other experimental semi-automatic rifles. However, none of the rifles entered into service before the end of World War II, with only 250 being made, and many others were never assembled. There were several problems with jamming and feed systems, which also delayed its testing.

History
Japan had experimented with semi-auto rifles in the 1930s when the Imperial Japanese Navy tested rifles based on the ZH-29. They were cancelled in the end due to problems encountered during tests.

During the Second World War, Japanese soldiers relied on bolt-action type rifles. However, guns were getting scarce and their main military opponent, the United States, had replaced their bolt weapons with modern semi-automatic rifles. 

At the same time, Nazi Germany and the Soviet Union were also developing their own semi-automatic weapons, such as the SVT-40 and Gewehr 43 which would give them a great advantage on the battlefield. This pressured Japan to find a quick way to cope with their military disadvantage. Instead of designing and investing in a new weapon from scratch, they opted to copy the American M1 Garand. 

Initially, the Japanese experimented with re-chambering captured American M1 rifles, since the 7.7 Japanese cartridge is dimensionally similar to the .30-06. They found that while the Garand could chamber, fire, and cycle with the 7.7 ammunition, the en-bloc clip system was incompatible with the cartridge and would not feed reliably. Instead the Japanese designers reverse engineered the M1 and discarded the en-bloc clip, replacing it with a fixed internal 10-round magazine charged by two 5-round Arisaka Type 99 stripper clips.

Japan had previously developed semi-automatic service rifles, but none of them had been viewed as successful or of trustworthy quality. The design work for the Type 4 began in 1944. 

The rifle was meant to be mass-produced in 1945. However, the Japanese defeat in the war in August halted its manufacturing. 

At the time, an estimate of 125 Type 4s were completed out of the 250 in the workshop. Twenty of them were taken by the Allies at the Yokosuka Naval Arsenal on Honshu after the end of the war.

An example of this rifle can be found in the US National Firearms Museum.

Variants
The following Type 4s were made:

 First Variant
 Second Variant
 Third Variant
 Pre-production Model
 Production Model

References

Bibliography

External links
 Japanese Type 4 Garand - Forgotten Weapons

World War II semi-automatic rifles
World War II infantry weapons of Japan
Trial and research firearms of Japan